Pierre Parrocel (1664–1739) was a French painter of the late-Baroque period.

Life
He was born in Avignon to a large family of artists, including his uncle Joseph Parrocel and his father, Louis Parrocel.  He was first instructed by his uncle, and then trained with Carlo Maratti in Rome, and in 1730 became a member of the Accademia di San Luca there.

Works
His principal work, as a painter, was in the gallery of the Hôtel de Noailles at St. Germain-en-Laye, where he represented the history of Tobit in thirteen pictures. He also painted a Coronation of the Virgin''' in the church of St. Mary at Marseille. He also etched and engraved in a style analogous to that of A. Rivalz; but he was not equally successful with the graver. Of the fourteen etchings left by him, The Triumph of Aphrodite'' is perhaps the most noteworthy.

References

1664 births
1739 deaths
Artists from Avignon
17th-century French painters
French male painters
18th-century French painters
French printmakers
Pierre
Pupils of Carlo Maratta
18th-century French male artists